(A) Senile Animal is the 15th album by American rock band Melvins, released on October 10, 2006 on Ipecac Recordings. After bassist Kevin Rutmanis' departure the two remaining members of the Melvins joined forces with Big Business, a duo consisting of Jared Warren on bass and Coady Willis on drums.

Background
On the line-up change, frontman Buzz Osborne spoke to Kerrang! in 2008, stating:

A music video for "The Talking Horse" was made and shown in 2007.

The song "A History of Bad Men" appears in the film I Know Who Killed Me and in the TV show True Detective.

Musical style
(A) Senile Animal features Melvins' signature sludge and stoner metal sound. AllMusic critic Greg Prato noted: "Although they started out primarily as a punk band that slowed down the riffs, the Melvins have also always mixed in prog rock-like bits, such as the tricky rhythms of 'Blood Witch' and the King Crimson/Tool-ish 'The Hawk.' The album also contains some of the group's most straightforward compositions in some time, including the metallic/new wave-ish ditty 'A History of Drunks.

Critical reception

AllMusic's Greg Prato wrote: "The transfusion of new blood has made one of rock's gnarliest beats even -- gnarlier!". Drowned in Sound's Grant Purdum stated: "In lieu of live albums and collaborations aplenty, A Senile Animal couldn't have snarled to life at a better time."

Track listing

Vinyl edition
The vinyl edition was released as a 4-LP box set from Hydra Head Records. Each LP featured music on one side and an etching on the other. This was limited to 300 copies in a variety of colors and designs.

Personnel
 Coady Willis – drums, vocals
 Dale Crover – drums, vocals
 Jared Warren – bass guitar, vocals
 King Buzzo – guitar, vocals

Additional personnel
 Toshi Kasai – engineer, mixing
 John Golden – mastering
 Mackie Osborne – art
 Kevin Willis – band photos

Charts
Billboard (North America)

References

Melvins albums
2006 albums
Ipecac Recordings albums